Lina Leandersson (born 27 September 1995) is an Iranian-Swedish  actress. She played the lead role of Eli in the 2008 Swedish romantic vampire film Let the Right One In, based on the novel by the same name. Born in Falun, Leandersson started performing at an early age. She acted in local amateur theatre performances, and had a few brief television appearances in 2006. At the age of eleven, Leandersson was cast to play one of the two leads in Tomas Alfredson's film, Let the Right One In, after applying for the role through a web-based casting service. The film was an international success, and Leandersson's performance as the vampire Eli brought her widespread critical acclaim as well as several awards and nominations. She has stated that she wants to continue acting.

Early life and career 
Lina Leandersson was born in Falun, Sweden. She took an interest in performing from an early age, acting in amateur theatre performances, attending drama courses, and performing street- and jazz dance. One of her first roles was in amateur theatre performance, playing the mother of a spoiled girl wanting new jeans. In 2006 she appeared as a jury member in the Swedish song competition Lilla Melodifestivalen. The same year, she was selected as one of five from five hundred applicants to participate in Nickelodeon's programledarskola, which was televised in October 2006.

Let the Right One In 
Leandersson applied for the role in Let the Right One In through a web-based casting service. After being contacted by child casting director Maggie Widstrand, she auditioned for the role three times before finally being cast. She was unaware that the role she was auditioning for was that of a vampire. "I was shocked", she later told Expressen; "I thought it was a more usual role." But as soon as she grew accustomed to the idea, "it became even more fun. I wanted to be a vampire when I was little", she said.

In the film, she plays Eli, a child vampire who develops a friendship with the main character, 12-year-old Oskar (played by Kåre Hedebrant). Oskar is frequently tormented by bullies. Eli initially tells Oskar to fight back, and rescues him in the end, killing three of the bullies in the process. Because Eli is supposed to be an androgynous character in the film, director Tomas Alfredson decided to overdub Leandersson's voice with a less feminine one. "Lina's voice is beautiful, but I thought it was too high in pitch", he said. Eli's voice throughout the whole film was provided by Elif Ceylan. In an interview with Dagens Nyheter, Leandersson laughingly commented that "it was actually nice to be dubbed, my voice sounds weird".

Leandersson and Hedebrant were never allowed to read the script. Instead, the director would read their lines aloud to them before every scene. According to Leandersson, "Tomas is a good teller. I listened very carefully." She identified the most difficult parts as the ones where she was supposed to be angry, and the transitioning between being normal and "crazy". In an interview, Leandersson recalled how she went totally into her role, to the point of "becoming" the character Eli, but affirmed that there are few similarities between herself and her character, describing Eli as more mature and contemplative. While she found it uncomfortable to film outdoor scenes in temperatures down to −30 °C, she described her experience as "the most fun [she] has ever had."

When asked about the biggest challenge in making the film, Alfredson mentioned the fact that people already would have a perception of the characters and the surroundings from the novel. He especially felt that the depiction of Eli was difficult, but stated that he was "very happy about Lina". On another occasion, he again commented positively on Leandersson's appearance, stating that "[w]e hardly used makeup or anything in post-production to make her like this, she is simply damn good. She's also a very special girl, which I think shows in the film." He has frequently commended Leandersson for her intelligence, often comparing her to "an 80-year-old woman, very wise and very quiet."

Reception 
Let the Right One In was an international success. Critics lauded the performances of the young leads, often highlighting Leandersson for particular acclaim. According to Karen Durbin of Elle, she "evokes Eli's radical apartness with an air of watchful caution and a contained stillness of body that not only belies her childish appearance (...)", and "In a performance devoid of sentimentality she perfectly captures the awful solitude of a creature who exists outside time". James Berardinelli also praised Leandersson for "crafting an individual who is both mysterious and compelling", while Justin Lowe of The Hollywood Reporter wrote: "The youthful actors imbue even the most emotional and disturbing scenes with remarkable complexity. Leandersson is particularly impressive as the conflicted young vampire who wants nothing more than to be an ordinary girl again". Luke Y. Thompson of LA Weekly compared her performance favorably to that of Kirsten Dunst as the child vampire Claudia in Interview with the Vampire. He concluded that, while Dunst "used to be the gold standard; in Leandersson, I think we have a new champion." The Oregonian called Leandersson's performance "incredible", and expressed doubt that any actress in the American remake could top it. While Swedish reviewers generally made positive comments about the two leads, Emma Engström of Göteborgs-Posten felt that Leandersson's character was lacking in depth.

Leandersson received several awards and award nominations for her performance in the film.

Other projects
In 2012, Lina filmed for Estonian director Kadri Kousaar's film The Arbiter and Swedish director Sofia Norlin's feature debut Tenderness.

Personal life 
Leandersson lives in Falun with her mother, stepfather, and two younger sisters. She is of Swedish and Iranian descent. Leandersson has always liked to dance and play theatre. Though there are several athletes in her family, she is not particularly fond of sports. "I was on a football team when I was in third grade. But I was so bad that I wasn't allowed to play in a match", she recalled. She has stated on several occasions that she wants to continue acting, and that she would like to try different types of roles to challenge herself. Leandersson was a student at Gruvrisskolan. In an interview, she noted history was her favourite subject, because she finds it "interesting to know how people lived and died in the past". She does not see school as a hindrance to continue acting, saying that she "will just have to work harder than everyone else. But school isn't that difficult, it's quite easy." She is a fan of the Twilight film series. In the years 2011–2014, she was studying theatre at  Kulturama, a school for performing arts in Stockholm, Sweden.

Awards

References

External links 

1995 births
Swedish film actresses
Living people
Swedish child actresses
People from Falun
Swedish people of Iranian descent
21st-century Swedish actresses